Yang Saing Koma Khmer: យ៉ង សាំងកុមារ is the founder of the Cambodian Center for Study and Development in Agriculture (CEDAC) and renowned for his creative fusion of practical science and collective will that has inspired and enabled farmers in Cambodia. He is recipient of the Ramon Magsaysay Award.

Political career
Yang Saing Koma is selected as candidate for Prime Minister by the Grassroots Democratic Party, one of the opposition parties in the July 29, 2018 parliamentary election of Cambodia.

References

Living people
Ramon Magsaysay Award winners
Year of birth missing (living people)